Leonid Viktorovich Zuyev (born 12 January 1991) is a former Russian professional footballer.

He made his professional debut in the Russian Second Division in 2008 for FC Sibir-2 Novosibirsk.

References

Russian footballers
1991 births
Living people
FC Sibir Novosibirsk players
Russian Premier League players
Association football midfielders
FC Chita players